Nizzi is a surname. Notable people with the surname include:

Claudio Nizzi (born 1938), Italian comic author
Enrico Nizzi (born 1990), Italian cross-country skier

See also
Rizzi

Italian-language surnames